Beth Hatalmud Rabbinical College, or in short known as Bais Hatalmud,
 is a small and selective Rabbinical college located in the Bensonhurst section of Brooklyn, New York.

Founding and mission

Background
Bais Hatalmud was founded in 1950 by students of the Mir Yeshiva in Belarus, which survived the Holocaust by escaping to Japan and ultimately found refuge in Shanghai where the yeshiva spent the war years. One of the deans of the Mir Yeshiva in Poland, Rabbi Avraham Kalmanowitz, managed to escape to America in 1940 and established a yeshiva in Brooklyn in 1946 that he called the Mir yeshiva. However, when the Mir student body arrived in the U.S. from Shanghai, they did not join the yeshiva founded by Rabbi Kalmanowitz. Some of the most distinguished students of the yeshiva held that while the yeshiva established by Rabbi Kalmanowitz was called the Mir Yeshiva, that yeshiva was not the Mir yeshiva that existed in Poland, and that the actual Mir Yeshiva was the one that went to Shanghai and arrived in America after World War II. This was because the institution of the Mir Yeshiva was based on the student body and that a yeshiva was based on the culture and values that were established by the yeshiva and that the yeshiva demanded its students abide by. In fact the idea that the basis of a yeshiva are the values and way of life it demanded of its students was how the original Mir yeshiva in Poland defined itself as what it gave it its identity.

Within the walls
It was therefore decided by the students of the original Mir yeshiva to establish a new institution in America that would serve as the continuation of the original Mir yeshiva. The fact that the Mir yeshiva was the only yeshiva in Europe to survive the Nazi destruction of European Jewry in its entirety was a primary reason they held that there should be a continuation of the original yeshiva in Europe in America after World War II. They called this Yeshiva Bais Hatalmud, which means The House of the Talmud.

The mission of this yeshiva was to have it be to continue the ideals and values of the Mir yeshiva was in Poland, and to preserve and uphold the way that things were in the original yeshiva. A very important aspect of the original yeshiva was a concept that was called living within the proverbial "walls" of the yeshiva. The concept of the "walls" of a yeshiva is that a yeshiva is its own world and culture separate from the world outside it. What is held to be important and what is respected and strived for within the yeshiva, is completely different than that of the outside world. Thus the proverbial "walls" of the yeshiva separate the world of the yeshiva, and those within it, from the world outside.

Bais Hatalmud was established to be a continuation of the Mir Yeshiva in Poland. Unlike other yeshivas in America which were shaped and formed to fit the American mentality of its students, Bais Hatalmud stressed the fact that the yeshiva's roots were the Mir Yeshiva in pre-war Europe and placed an emphasis on maintaining the spirit and values of that yeshiva.

Academics
Bais Hatalmud has an undergraduate division and a post graduate division. In the post graduate division students eventually move on from the subjects that are being studied in the yeshiva, which are limited to civil jurisprudence, and form groups where they study other parts of the Talmud. The school's accreditation is from the Association of Advanced Rabbinical and Talmudic Schools.

History
A month after Rabbi Aryeh Leib Malin's marriage in 1948, a meeting was held in his home to establish Yeshivas 
Beis Hatalmud. The founding chaburah included, Rabbi Bezalel Tannenbaum, Rabbi Levi Krupenia (R"Y Toras Emes Kamenitz), Rabbi Leib Shachar, Rabbi Leizer Horodzhesky, Rabbi Simcha Zissel Levovitz, (Rabbi Yeruchom Levovitz's son), Rabbi Shmuel (Charkover) Wilensky, Rabbi Chaim Wysokier, Rabbi Binyomin Paler, Rabbi Avrohom Levovitz, Rabbi Sholom Menashe Gottlieb, Rabbi Yisroel Perkowski, Rabbi Baruch Leib Sassoon Rabbi Aaron Zablotsky.

Rabbi Aryeh Leib Malin, along with Rabbi Chaim Wysokier served as the Roshei Hayeshiva. After the passing of Rabbi Malin, Harav Chaim Wysokier remained alone at the helm of the Yeshiva. Later, after Rabbi Wysokier died, the Yeshiva was led by its three remaining elders, including Harav Shalom Menashe Gotlieb, Harav Yisroel Perkowski and Harav Binyomin Zeilberger. After the passing of the Rosh yeshivah Rav Chaim Wyoskeir, there was a din torah to decide who will lead the Yeshiva. Many years of confusion and controversy followed. Today the hanhala is led by Rabbi Naftali Kaplan along with Rabbi Yehuda Zeilberger and Rabbi Chaim Leib Perkowski, Rabbi Mendel Bromberg also plays a significant role. The highest shiur is given by Rabbi Chaim Weinstein followed by Rabbi Leib Weiss and Rabbi Moshe Baron. Weekly chaburos are given by Rabbi Yitzchok Rubnitz.

In 2020 the unmarried student body of the Yeshiva had shrunk sizably, while the Kollel, or the married student body, still remained in approximately the same capacity. In addition to this crushing loss of young energy, sky-high housing prices as well as an overall housing shortage were severely threatening the continued and sustainable existence of this legendary Yeshiva community. Rabbi Mendel Bromberg and the acting Roshei Yeshiva reached a decision to bring in a fresh face to deliver Shiur in an effort to reinvigorate and restore the flailing Yeshiva. The man they chose for this was a brilliant, relatively young Talmudic scholar Rabbi Avrohom Shlomo Katz from Lakewood, NJ. Previously, Rabbi Katz had led a prestigious Chabura in Bais Medrash Govoha of Lakewood, and had spent his formative years learning in Yeshiva Gedolah of Paterson under the leadership of Rabbi Eliyahu Chaim Swerdloff shlit"a. Rabbi Swerdloff, or as he is popularly known Reb Elyah Chaim, had learnt in Bais Hatalmud for nearly 30 years, eventually coming to deliver chaburos in his home for the Kollel students. When the complications arose over who would lead the Yeshiva after Rabbi Chaim Wysokier died, Rabbi Swerdloff left to open his own Yeshiva in the spirit of Bais Hatalmud in Paterson NJ.

Rav Brus preparatory program
In addition to the undergraduate and post graduate divisions, Bais Hatalmud also has a two-year preparatory program for students that are sixteen and seventeen years old. This division was headed by Rabbi Shaul Brus who died in 2007, and is currently headed by Rabbi Brus' son, R'Moshe Mendel Brus. Rabbi Brus studied under Rabbi Boruch Ber Leibowitz in the Kamenitz Yehiva in Lithuania prior to World War II. Rabbi Shaul Brus had a unique approach to instructing young students in the talmud. Instead of training them how to study and analyze the text, his approach was to teach the students how to think. In place of studying the actual text he would discuss the general subject, introducing the students to the deeper concepts in talmudic theory and having them discuss these ideas using the Socratic Method.

Rabbi Brus would especially use the work of Rabbi Boruch Ber Leibowitz, Birkas Shmuel, which covers in great depth and detail theories and approaches to understanding the Talmud and the Rishonim on areas of civil jurisprudence. The work Birkas Shmuel is very difficult to understand, even for accomplished Talmudic scholars. Students who studied under Rabbi Brus are of the select few that were trained to properly understand the Birkas Shmuel.

See also
Mir yeshiva (Belarus)

References

External links
 about the Yeshiva and R'Aryeh Leib Malin

1950 establishments in New York City
Belarusian-Jewish culture in New York City
Educational institutions established in 1950
Jewish seminaries
Men's universities and colleges in the United States
Mir Yeshiva
Orthodox yeshivas in Brooklyn
Seminaries and theological colleges in New York City
Universities and colleges in Brooklyn